Phyllis of the Follies is a 1928 American silent comedy film directed by Ernst Laemmle and starring Alice Day, Matt Moore and Edmund Burns.

Cast
 Alice Day as Phyllis Sherwood  
 Matt Moore as Howard Decker  
 Edmund Burns as Clyde Thompson  
 Lilyan Tashman as Mrs. Decker  
 Duane Thompson as Mabel Lancing

References

Bibliography
 Roots, James. The 100 Greatest Silent Film Comedians. Rowman & Littlefield, 2014.

External links

1928 films
1928 comedy films
Silent American comedy films
Films directed by Ernst Laemmle
American silent feature films
1920s English-language films
Universal Pictures films
American black-and-white films
1920s American films